Lake Central High School (LCHS) is a high school in St. John, Indiana, for students in grades nine through twelve. Its students come from St. John Township which includes the towns of St. John and Dyer (north of 101st Ave), the entire town of Schererville, unincorporated Crown Point (north of 101st Ave), and the southeastern section of Griffith that is within St. John Township. It is the only high school in the Lake Central School Corporation.

History
The school opened in 1967. It includes an attached freshmen wing (Freshmen Center) which opened in 1994. The current high school succeeded Dyer Central High School. The Dyer Central Building became the building for Kahler Middle School which is still part of the Lake Central School Corporation. The Dyer Central building was demolished in 1993–94 as part of renovations made to Kahler Middle school.

Between 1967 and 1983, a television station, WCAE (channel 50), operated from the Lake Central High School campus.

Some Lake Central students and faculty were the subject of an October 20, 2012, Wall Street Journal front-page article on their collective work to track down and document Indiana's battle casualties.  A similar story appeared during the CBS Evening News in 2013 showing teacher and students working on their Hero Project.

Lake Central made the news again in 2017 when teacher Samantha Cox was videotaped using cocaine in her classroom by a student. Cox later pleaded guilty to the incident in 2018.

Academics
In the 2019 U.S. News & World Report annual ranking of secondary schools, Lake Central was ranked 3,405th nationally and 56th in Indiana.

Demographics
The demographic breakdown of the 3,310 students enrolled for the 2017-2018 school year was:
Native American/Alaskan - 0.5%
Asian - 3.4%
Black - 6.6%
Hispanic - 13.7%
White - 73.0%
Multiracial - 2.8%
33.7% of the students qualified for free or reduced-cost lunch. For 2017-18, Lake Central was a Title I school.

Renovations
Lake Central High School underwent many renovations from 2011-2016.  In November 2011, voters of the Tri-Town community passed a building referendum to renovate and rebuild the school. The referendum, in which Lake Central and the district's Protsman Elementary School was renovated and rebuilt, was for $160,000,000. All academic areas of the school were rebuilt or improved, followed by fine arts and many new athletic facilities to help bring the school up to modern standards.  This renovation was the first major and most recent renovation to the school, which opened its doors in 1967.

Athletics
Lake Central is a member of the Indiana High School Athletic Association (IHSAA) and the Duneland Athletic Conference (DAC), and offers its students twenty different school-sanctioned sports. The nickname for Lake Central's athletic teams is the "Indians." The school has won seven IHSAA State Championships. These championships include: 1987 Boys' Swimming, 1992 Softball, 1994 Girls' Basketball, 2002 Softball, 2004 Softball, 2010 Boys' Soccer, and 2012 Baseball.

Fall sports
 Boys' Cross Country
 Girls' Cross Country
 Football
 Girls' Golf
 Boys' Soccer
 Girls' Soccer
 Boys' Tennis
 Volleyball

Winter sports
 Boys' Basketball
 Girls' Basketball
 Girls' Gymnastics
 Boys' Hockey
 Boys' Swimming
 Girls' Swimming
 Wrestling
 Bowling

Spring sports
 Baseball
 Boys' Golf
 Softball
 Boys' Track and Field
 Girls' Track and Field
 Girls' Tennis

Notable people

Alumni

Eric Gehrig – Major League Soccer (MLS) defender
Rob Mackowiak – Major League Baseball (MLB) utility player 
Bobby Pesavento – Arena Football League quarterback 
Glenn Robinson III – National Basketball Association (NBA) player 
Jared Tomich – National Football League (NFL) player 
Tyler Wideman (born 1995), basketball player in the Israeli National League

Staff
Al Pilarcik - MLB outfielder and faculty member at Lake Central

See also
 List of high schools in Indiana

References

External links
 Official website

Public high schools in Indiana
Schools in Lake County, Indiana
Educational institutions established in 1967
1967 establishments in Indiana